Tenellia fidenciae is a species of sea slug, an aeolid nudibranch, a marine gastropod mollusc in the family Fionidae.

Distribution
This species was described from Playa del barranco de Avalos, Isla de La Gomera, the Canary Islands. It has been reported from Caloura, Sao Miguel Island, Azores and Montana Roja, Tenerife.

References 

Fionidae
Gastropods described in 1999